Randall Smith (born March 8, 1960) is a Canadian electroacoustic music composer living in Toronto.

Recordings

 Sondes (empreintes DIGITALes, IMED 9948, 1999)
 L'oreille voit (empreintes DIGITALes, IMED 9416, 1994)

List of works

 The Black Museum (1993)
 Collision (1996)
 Continental Rift (1995), cello, and tape
 Convergence (1998), accordion, and tape
 CounterBlast (1990)
 Elastic Rebound (1995)
 The Face of the Waters (1988)
 Fleeting Wheels of Changes (1987)
 InsideOut (1999)
 Liquid Fragments 1 (1996), doublebass, alto flute, and tape
 One Voice Circles (2002)
 Ruptures (1991)
 The Unmoved Centre (1997)
 La volière (1994)
 Wavelengths (2004)

References

1960 births
Living people
Electroacoustic music composers
Canadian composers
Canadian male composers
Musicians from Windsor, Ontario